Katsuhiko Nakaya (born 22 April 1957) is a Brazilian sprinter. He competed in the 100 metres at the 1980 Summer Olympics and the 1984 Summer Olympics.

References

External links
 

1957 births
Living people
Athletes (track and field) at the 1980 Summer Olympics
Athletes (track and field) at the 1984 Summer Olympics
Brazilian male sprinters
Olympic athletes of Brazil
Athletes (track and field) at the 1983 Pan American Games
Pan American Games athletes for Brazil
People from Araçatuba
Brazilian people of Japanese descent
Universiade medalists in athletics (track and field)
Universiade bronze medalists for Brazil
Sportspeople from São Paulo (state)
20th-century Brazilian people